Marijana Mićić (Serbian Cyrillic: Маријана Мићић; born 20 March 1983) is a Serbian TV host, and occasional actress, best known as the host of Veliki Brat, the Serbian version of Big Brother. She has hosted a number of shows, most of them for the Serbian production company Emotion. She also took part in the Serbian remake of The Simple Life, alongside Ana Mihajlovski.

Sometimes other TV hosts address her by her nickname Mara. During 2008, while hosting Najgori od sve dece, she and her co-host, Maca, came up with a sentence which later became their catchphrase: "Najav'la!".

Appearances
As an actress:
2004 Te quiero, Radiša (I love you, Radiša), TV movie
2007 Ljubav i mržnja (Love and hate), TV series
As a contestant:
2004–2006 Jednostavan život (The Simple Life), reality TV series
As a host:
2003 Bunga Banga Re, children's interactive television
2004 Superheroj sa Ostrva Snova (Superhero from Dream Island), children interactive television
2005 Hoćeš, nećeš?!, TV show, similar to MTV's I Bet You Will
2006 Leteći start, TV show
since 2006 Veliki Brat (Big Brother)
 2008 Najgori od sve dece (The Worst of All the Children), variety show; an Operacija trijumf spin off
 2012 Dnevni Magazin, TV show
 2014 Pinkove zvezdice, Talent show

References

External links
 

Serbian television presenters
Serbian women television presenters
Serbian television actresses
1983 births
Television people from Belgrade
Living people